The Hebrides are an archipelago of islands off the western coast of Scotland. These islands include two main groups:
 The Inner Hebrides
 The Outer Hebrides

Hebrides or Hebridean may also refer to:
Hebridean (sheep), a breed of sheep
Hebrides Overture, a concert overture by Felix Mendelssohn
New Hebrides, the former colonial name of Vanuatu

See also
Sea of the Hebrides, portion of the North Atlantic Ocean located off the coast of western Scotland